The First Texan is a 1956 American Western film in CinemaScope and Technicolor directed by Byron Haskin. It stars Joel McCrea and Felicia Farr.

Plot
Sam Houston, a lawyer and former governor of Tennessee, travels to San Antonio, Texas to begin a new life. He encounters Jim Bowie, who is determined to free the territory from Mexico's rule.

Bowie is tried for treason. Houston represents him in court and successfully argues that the charge against Bowie must be dismissed because Mexico was not under martial law at the time.

Katherine Delaney comes into Houston's life. He still is married back home, but separated and dictates a letter requesting a formal divorce. Katherine will not become involved with Houston unless he changes into the man she wants him to be and not become actively involved in the fight to free Texas.

Davy Crockett relays a message from U.S. president Andrew Jackson, who wants Houston to lead the revolution. There are not enough troops at the Alamo to hold off General Antonio López de Santa Anna and the large Mexican army and the Alamo falls. Later. when Houston appears to be in full retreat, some of his men begin to feel he must be replaced.

It turns out Houston was planning a surprise attack. His forces are told to "remember the Alamo," and they proceed to overwhelm Santa Anna and his men. Texas is declared a free republic, and Sam Houston its first president, a movement that eventually will lead to statehood.

Cast

See also
 List of American films of 1956

References

External links
 
 
 
 

1956 films
1956 Western (genre) films
Allied Artists films
CinemaScope films
American Western (genre) films
Films scored by Roy Webb
Films directed by Byron Haskin
Films produced by Walter Mirisch
Davy Crockett
Texas Revolution films
1950s English-language films
1950s American films
Cultural depictions of James Bowie